Mika Aereen Marcaliñas Reyes (born June 21, 1994) is a Filipino volleyball player. She is a Middle Hitter/Blocker and is currently playing in the PVL Premier Volleyball League in the Philippines.

Early life
Reyes grew up in Pulilan, Bulacan with her parents and four other siblings. Her family owns a resort named after their hometown.
She finished her high school studies at St. Scholastica's College, Manila. She then got recruited and enrolled to De La Salle University. She took up AB Psychology and graduated on June 18, 2016.

Career
Reyes was named Best Attacker at the 2013 PVF Intercollegiate Volleyball Championship and Most Valuable Player in the 2015 edition.
Reyes won the 2014 Philippine National Games Best Blocker award, and was the 1st Best Middle Blocker in its 2015 edition. She was part of the DLSU Lady Spikers champion teams of UAAP Season 74, Season 75, and Season 78. Playing under F2 Logistics, she was named as the brand ambassador of the Philippine Super Liga for its 2016 season. On July 28, 2016, Reyes was selected as the 7th and final volleyball player to join the Philippine special representative team to compete in the 2016 FIVB Volleyball Women's Club World Championship.

On January 11, 2017, Reyes signed a two-year deal with the Petron Blaze Spikers.

She was a member of the  PSL selections that competed in the 2016 FIVB Volleyball Women's Club World Championship, the 2017 Asian Women's Club Volleyball Championship in Kazakhstan, and the 2017 Annual H.R.H. Princess Maha Chakri Sirindhorn's Cup in Thailand, where they won the bronze medal.

Reyes was named team captain of the Philippine women's volleyball national team in May 2017. The team competed in the 2017 Asian Championship, and the 2017 Southeast Asian Games in Malaysia.

With Petron Blaze Spikers, Reyes won the 2017 PSL Invitational Cup silver medal, the 2017 PSL All-Filipino Conference gold medal with the Second Best Middle Blocker award, and silver medal in the 2017 PSL Grand Prix Conference with the First Best Middle Blocker award.

Clubs
  Meralco Power Spikers (2015)
  F2 Logistics Cargo Movers (2016)
  Petron Blaze Spikers (2017–2019)
  Sta. Lucia Lady Realtors (2020–2021)
  PLDT High Speed Hitters (2022–present)

Awards

Individuals
 2013 PVF Intercollegiate Championship "Best Attacker"
 2014 Philippine National Games "Best Blocker"
 2015 Philippine National Games "1st Best Middle Blocker"
 2015 PVF Intercollegiate Championship "Most Valuable Player"
 2017 PSL All-Filipino "2nd Best Middle Blocker"
 2017 PSL Grand Prix "1st Best Middle Blocker"
 2018 PSL Grand Prix "2nd Best Middle Blocker"
 2018 Philippine Super Liga Invitational Cup "1st Best Middle Blocker"
 2022 Premier Volleyball League Invitational Conference "1st Best Middle Blocker"

Recognitions
 2017 DLSAA Lasallian Sports Achievement Award
 2016 Philippine Super Liga Ambassadress
 2016 Philippine Sports Association Miss Volleyball

Collegiate
 UAAP Season 74 volleyball tournaments -  Champions, with DLSU Lady Spikers
 UAAP Season 75 volleyball tournaments -  Champions, with DLSU Lady Spikers
 UAAP Season 76 volleyball tournaments -  Silver medal, with DLSU Lady Spikers
 UAAP Season 77 volleyball tournaments -  Silver medal, with DLSU Lady Spikers
 UAAP Season 78 volleyball tournaments -  Champions, with DLSU Lady Spikers

Clubs
 2016 Philippine Super Liga All-Filipino –  Champion, with F2 Logistics Cargo Movers
 2016 Philippine Super Liga Grand Prix –  Bronze medal, with F2 Logistics Cargo Movers
 2017 Philippine Super Liga Invitational –  Silver medal, with Petron Blaze Spikers
 2017 Philippine Super Liga All-Filipino –  Champion, with Petron Blaze Spikers
 2017 H.R.H. Princess Maha Chakri Sirindhorn's Cup –  Bronze medal, with Philippine Super Liga All-Stars
 2017 Philippine Super Liga Grand Prix –  Silver medal, with Petron Blaze Spikers
 2018 Philippine Super Liga All-Filipino – 
Champion, with Petron Blaze Spikers
 2018 Philippine SuperLiga Grand Prix –  Champion, with Petron Blaze Spikers
 2018 Philippine Super Liga Invitational –  Silver medal, with Petron Blaze Spikers
2019 Philippine SuperLiga Grand Prix –  Champion, with Petron Blaze Spikers

References

External links

1994 births
Living people
Filipino women's volleyball players
University Athletic Association of the Philippines volleyball players
Sportspeople from Bulacan
De La Salle University alumni
Middle blockers
St. Scholastica's College Manila alumni
Competitors at the 2017 Southeast Asian Games
Volleyball players at the 2018 Asian Games
Competitors at the 2019 Southeast Asian Games
Asian Games competitors for the Philippines
Southeast Asian Games competitors for the Philippines